The Men's 400m T53 had its First Round held on September 9 at 19:45 and its Final on September 11 at 18:42.

Medalists

Results

References
Round 1 - Heat 1
Round 1 - Heat 2
Round 1 - Heat 3
Final

Athletics at the 2008 Summer Paralympics